2000 Population and Housing Census (PHC 2000) ( (REL 2000)) was a census that was carried out during 31 March 2000 – 9 April 2000 in Estonia by Statistics Estonia.

The total actual population recorded was 1,370,052 persons and 67.9% of them were Estonians. Compared to 1989 Estonia Census population was decreased by 195,000 persons (12.5%).

See also
Demographics of Estonia

References

External links
Results at Statistics Estonia

Censuses in Estonia
Demographics of Estonia
Ethnic groups in Estonia
2000 in Estonia
Estonia